Birds of Fire is the second studio album by jazz fusion band the Mahavishnu Orchestra. It was released on January 3, 1973, by Columbia Records and is the last studio album released by the original band line-up before it dissolved.

As with the group's previous album, The Inner Mounting Flame, Birds of Fire consists solely of compositions by John McLaughlin. These include the track "Miles Beyond (Miles Davis)", which McLaughlin dedicated to his friend and former bandleader.

The back cover of the album features the poem "Revelation" by Sri Chinmoy.

Release history
In addition to the standard two-channel stereo album there was also a four-channel quadraphonic version released in 1973 on LP and 8-track tape. The quad LP was encoded in the SQ matrix format.

The first CD issue was in 1986. A remastered version of the album was released on CD in 2000 by Sony Music Entertainment. It features a new set of liner notes by JazzTimes critic Bill Milkowski, as well as photographs of the band. In 2015 the album was re-issued on Super Audio CD by Audio Fidelity containing both the stereo and quad mixes. The same content was re-issued on SACD in Japan in 2021 by Sony Music.

The track "Celestial Terrestrial Commuters" appears on the six-CD box set Jazz: The Smithsonian Anthology, released by Smithsonian Folkways in 2011, covering the history of jazz.

Reception
Reviewing the album for All About Jazz in 2002, Walter Kolosky said of the title track:
"Birds of Fire," which opens up the album, is a fusion classic. John McLaughlin scares the hell out of his guitar with his melodic convulsions. If you ever want to frighten a musical neophyte, turn your stereo up really loud and play the cover tune – it's guaranteed to send him or her fleeing.

Track listing
All tracks composed by John McLaughlin.

Personnel

Musicians
John McLaughlinguitars
Rick Lairdbass
Billy Cobhamdrums, percussion
Jan Hammerkeyboards, Moog synthesizer, Fender Rhodes
Jerry Goodmanviolin

Technical
Ken Scott, Jim Greenaudio engineer
 Ashok (Chris Poisson)album design
 Nathan WeissManagement
 Pranavanandaphotography

Charts

References

External links 
Sri Chinmoy Poetry: Revelation
Mahavishnu Orchestra – Birds Of Fire at discogs.com

Mahavishnu Orchestra albums
1973 albums
Columbia Records albums
Albums recorded at CBS 30th Street Studio
Albums recorded at Trident Studios